Money Magic is a 1917 American silent drama film directed by William Wolbert and starring Antonio Moreno, Laura Winston and Edith Storey.

Cast
 Antonio Moreno as Ben Fordyce
 Laura Winston as Mrs. Gilman
 Edith Storey as Bertha Gilman
 William Duncan as Marshall Haney
 Florence Dye as Alice Heath

References

Bibliography
 Goble, Alan. The Complete Index to Literary Sources in Film. Walter de Gruyter, 1999.

External links
 

1917 films
1917 drama films
1910s English-language films
American silent feature films
Silent American drama films
American black-and-white films
Vitagraph Studios films
Films directed by William Wolbert
1910s American films